The Other Side of Jimmy Smith is a 1970 album by jazz musician Jimmy Smith that was released by MGM in UK and Verve Records in France.

Track listing

Side one
 "My Romance" (Richard Rodgers, Lorenz Hart) – 3:29
 "Why Don't You Try?" (Johnny Pate) – 4:33
 "Bewitched" (Rodgers, Hart) – 3:40
 "You Don't Know What Love Is" (Don Raye, Gene de Paul) – 4:11
 "Yesterday" (John Lennon, Paul McCartney) – 3:05

Side two
 "Nobody Knows" (Michel Legrand, Alan and Marilyn Bergman) – 3:50
 "Bridge Over Troubled Water" (Paul Simon) – 5:05
 "Close To You" (Burt Bacharach, Hal David) – 2:30
 "What Are You Doing the Rest of Your Life?" (Legrand, Bergman, Bergman) – 4:26
 "My Way" (Claude François, Jacques Revaux, Paul Anka) – 3:07

Personnel

Musicians
 Jimmy Smith – organ
 Ron Carter – bass
 Joe Beck – guitar
 Jerome Richardson – flute
 Gene Orloff – violin

Technical
 Johnny Pate – producer, arranger, conductor
 Rich Jacobs – engineer, (TTG Sound Studios)
 Tory Brainard – engineer, (Bell Sound Studios)

References

1970 albums
Jimmy Smith (musician) albums
Verve Records albums